Calvin is an unincorporated community in Bell County, Kentucky, United States. The area on the south side of the river is also known as Page, which was the name of the Louisville and Nashville Railroad station in the community. Calvin has a post office with ZIP code 40813, which opened on April 3, 1908.

References

Unincorporated communities in Bell County, Kentucky
Unincorporated communities in Kentucky